1-Bromododecane is the organobromine compound with the formula Br(CH2)11CH3. It is a colorless liquid.  It is used as a long chain alkylating agent to improve the lipophilicity and hydrophobicity of organic molecules for biological applications.

Production 
Most 1-bromoalkanes are prepared by free-radical addition of hydrogen bromide to the 1-alkene. These conditions lead to anti-Markovnikov addition, giving the 1-bromo derivative.

1-Bromododecane can also be prepared by treating dodecanol with hydrobromic acid and sulfuric acid.
CH3(CH2)11OH  +  HBr   →   CH3(CH2)11Br  +  H2O

References

Bromoalkanes